Murder on the Blackpool Express is a 2017 comedy drama television film created by Jason Cook. Starring Johnny Vegas, Sian Gibson, Sheila Reid, Katy Cavanagh, Una Stubbs (In her final performance), Nina Wadia, Kimberley Nixon , Matthew Cottle, Nigel Havers, Javone Prince, Susie Blake, Mark Heap, Griff Rhys Jones and Kevin Eldon.

A sequel, Death on the Tyne, aired on Gold the following year, on 15 December 2018. A third film titled Dial M For Middlesbrough aired in 2019.

A three-part follow-up series titled Murder They Hope aired on Gold with the first episode on 8 May 2021. A second series aired on Gold in late 2022.

It is one of Gold's most watched programmes, reaching 1.242 million people.

Episodes

Cast
 Johnny Vegas as Terry Bremmer
 Sian Gibson as Gemma Draper
 Sheila Reid as Mildred
 Una Stubbs as Peggy
 Katy Cavanagh as Grace
 Matthew Cottle as George
 Kimberley Nixon as Laura Bishop
 Nina Wadia as Moira Colliston
 Mark Heap as Graham
 Nigel Havers as Doc
 Kevin Eldon as Kevin
 Javone Prince as Ben
 Griff Rhys Jones as David
 Susie Blake as Marge Grimshaw
 Jason Cook as Arcade Attendant
 Layla Cook as Young Laura Bishop
 Catherine Harvey as Mary
 Steve Brody as Barry
 Peter Singh as PC Collins
 Chris Anderson as Medic 1
 Chris Ramsey as Medic 2

References

External links

2017 television films
2017 comedy-drama films
2010s serial killer films
British comedy-drama television films
British serial killer films
Films about vacationing
2017 films
2010s English-language films
2010s British films